Haneda Airport Terminal 3 Station is a railway station at Tokyo International Airport in Ōta, Tokyo, Japan. The station is operated by the private railway operator Keikyu and Tokyo Monorail. The station opened on October 21, 2010.

Lines
Tokyo Monorail Haneda Airport Line
Keikyu Airport Line

Station layout

The Keikyu platforms are located underground with elevators and escalators to carry passengers to the arrival and departure levels of Terminal 3. The Keikyu platforms consist of two side platforms serving two tracks. The Tokyo Monorail platforms are located above ground, connected to the third floor of the terminal building.

Keikyu platforms

Tokyo Monorail platforms

History

The Tokyo Monorail station opened on 21 October 2010.

On March 27, 2010, there was a fire in the station building under construction that burnt an area of approximately 700 square meters and injured one worker.

Keikyu introduced station numbering to its stations on 21 October 2010; Haneda Airport Terminal 3 Station was assigned station number KK16.

Before the changes, two operators used different names for the station in Japanese:
Keikyu: 
Tokyo Monorail: 

Passenger statistics
In fiscal 2011, the Tokyo Monorail station was used by an average of 6,467 passengers daily.

See also
 List of railway stations in Japan

References

External links

 Tokyo Monorail station information 

Tokyo Monorail Haneda Line
Stations of Tokyo Monorail
Railway stations in Tokyo
Railway stations in Japan opened in 2010
Airport railway stations in Japan
Haneda Airport
Ōta, Tokyo